The 2012–13 Santa Clara Broncos women's basketball team represented Santa Clara University in the 2012–13 college basketball season. It was head coach Jennifer Mountain's fifth season at Santa Clara. The Broncos, members of the West Coast Conference, played their home games at the Leavey Center. The Broncos would finish the season 14–16, 6–10 in conference, to finish in a tie for 5th place. Despite having the better overall record, the Broncos were awarded the 6th seed in the WCC Tournament and were eliminated in the 2nd round.

Before the season
The Gaels were picked to finish fifth in the WCC.

Roster

Schedule and results

|-
!colspan=9 style="background:#F0E8C4; color:#AA003D;"| Exhibition

|-
!colspan=9 style="background:#AA003D; color:#F0E8C4;"| Regular Season

|-
!colspan=9 style="background:#F0E8C4; color:#AA003D;"| 2013 West Coast Conference women's basketball tournament

Rankings

See also
Santa Clara Broncos women's basketball

References

Santa Clara Broncos women's basketball seasons
Santa Clara